The Flaxville Gravels is a geologic formation in Montana. It preserves fossils dating back to the Neogene period.

See also

 List of fossiliferous stratigraphic units in Montana
 Paleontology in Montana

References
 

Geologic formations of Montana
Neogene stratigraphic units of North America